Panjugula Rohith Reddy is an Indian politician also famously known as Pilot Rohith Reddy who represents Tandur as a member of the Telangana Legislative Assembly. He was first elected in the 2018 Telangana Legislative Assembly election, where he received 70428 votes.

References 

Telangana MLAs 2018–2023
1984 births
Living people